Ursula Schultze-Bluhm (17 November 1921 – 9 April 1999), also known as Ursula, was a German painter. 

In 1979 she was  part of the Sydney Biennial. 

Her work is included in the collections of the Fine Arts Museums of San Francisco, the Museum Ludwig, Cologne and the Museum Fur Moderne Kunst in Frankfurt, Germany.

Schultze-Bluhm died in Cologne in 1999.

Personal life
She married Bernard Schultze in 1955. They lived and worked in Cologne from 1968.

References

1921 births
1999 deaths
20th-century German women artists